The Japanese language makes use of a system of honorific speech, called , which includes honorific suffixes and prefixes when referring to others in a conversation. Suffixes are often gender-specific at the end of names, while prefixes are attached to the beginning of many nouns. Honorific suffixes also indicated the speaker's level and referred an individual's relationship and are often used alongside other components of Japanese honorific speech.

Honorific suffixes are generally used when referring to the person one is talking to or unrelated people and are not used when referring to oneself. The omission of suffixes implies a high degree of intimacy or close friendship.

Usage 
Although honorifics are not essential to the grammar of Japanese, they are a fundamental part of its sociolinguistics, and their proper use is deemed essential to proficient and appropriate speech.

The use of honorifics is closely related to Japanese social structures and hierarchies. For example, a 1986 study on the notion that Japanese women spoke more politely than men examined each sex's use of honorifics found that while women spoke more politely on average than men, both sexes used the same level of politeness in the same relative situation. Thus, the difference in politeness was a result of the average social station of women versus men as opposed to an inherent characteristic. Usage in this respect has changed over time as well. A 2012 study from Kobe Shoin Women's University found that the use of honorific suffixes and other polite speech markers have increased significantly over time, while age, sex, and other social variables have become less significant. The paper concluded that honorifics have shifted from a basis in power dynamics to one of personal distance.

They can be applied to either the first or last name depending on which is given. In situations where both the first and last names are spoken, the suffix is attached to whichever comes last in the word order. Japanese names traditionally follow the Eastern name order.

An honorific is generally used when referring to the person one is talking to (one's interlocutor), or when referring to an unrelated third party in speech. However, it is dropped by some superiors when referring to one's in-group or informal writing. It is never used to refer to oneself, except for dramatic effect or some exceptional cases.

Within sports teams or among classmates, where the interlocutors approximately are of the same age or seniority, it can be acceptable to use family names without honorifics. Some people of the younger generation, roughly born since 1970, prefer to be referred to without an honorific. However, dropping honorifics is a sign of informality even with casual acquaintances.

When referring to a third person, honorifics are used except when referring to one's family members while talking to a non-family member or when referring to a member of one's company while talking to a customer or someone from another company—this is the uchi–soto (in-group / out-group) distinction. Honorifics are not used to refer to oneself, except when trying to be arrogant (ore-sama), to be cute (-chan), or sometimes when talking to young children to teach them how to address the speaker.

Use of honorifics is correlated with other forms of honorific speech in Japanese, such as the use of the polite form (-masu, desu) versus the plain form—that is, using the plain form with a polite honorific (-san, -sama) can be jarring.

While these honorifics are solely used on proper nouns, these suffixes can turn common nouns into appropriate nouns when attached to the end of them.

Translation 
When translating honorific suffixes into English, separate pronouns or adjectives must be used to convey characteristics to the person they are referencing. While some honorifics such as -san are very frequently used due to their gender neutrality and straightforward definition of polite unfamiliarity, other honorifics such as -chan or -kun are more specific as to the context in which they must be used as well as the implications they give off when attached to a person's name. These implications can only be translated into English using adjectives or adjective word phrases.

Common honorifics 
The most common honorifics include:

San 

, sometimes pronounced  in Kansai dialect, is the most commonplace honorific and is a title of respect typically used between equals of any age. Although the closest analog in English are the honorifics "Mr.", "Miss", "Ms.", or "Mrs.", -san is almost universally added to a person's name; -san can be used in formal and informal contexts, regardless of the person's gender. It is also commonly used to convert common nouns into proper ones, as discussed below.

San is sometimes used with company names. For example, the offices or shop of a company called Kojima Denki might be referred to as "Kojima Denki-san" by another nearby company. This may be seen on small maps often used in phone books and business cards in Japan, where the names of surrounding companies are written using -san.

When referring to their spouse as a third party in a conversation, married people often refer to them with -san.

Due to -san being gender-neutral and commonly used, it can refer to any stranger or acquaintance whom one does not see as a friend. However, it may not be appropriate when using it on someone close or when it is clear that other honorifics should be used.

Sama 

 is a more respectful version for individuals of a higher rank than oneself. Appropriate usages include divine entities, guests or customers (such as a sports venue announcer addressing members of the audience), and sometimes towards people one greatly admires. It is the root word for -san.

Sama customarily follows the addressee's name on all formal correspondence and postal services where the addressee is, or is interpreted as, a customer.

Kun 

  is generally used by people of senior status addressing or referring to those of junior status, or it can be used when referring to men in general, male children or male teenagers, or among male friends. It can be used by males or females when addressing a male to whom they are emotionally attached, or whom they have known for a long time. Although it may seem rude in workplaces, the suffix is also used by seniors when referring to juniors in both academic situations and workplaces, more typically when the two people are associated.

Although -kun is generally used for boys, it is not a hard rule. For example, -kun can be used to name a close personal friend or family member of any gender. In business settings, young female employees are addressed as -kun by older males of senior status. It can be used by male teachers addressing their female students.

Kun can mean different things depending on gender. Kun for females is a more respectful honorific than -chan, implying childlike cuteness. Kun is not only used to address females formally; it can also be used for a very close friend or family member. Calling a female -kun is not insulting and can also mean that the person is respected, although that is not the normal implication. Rarely, sisters with the same name, such as "Miku", may be differentiated by calling one "Miku-chan" and the other "Miku-san" or "-sama", and on some occasions,"-kun". Chan and -kun occasionally mean similar things. The general use of -kun for females implies respectful endearment and that the person being referred to is sweet and kind.

In the National Diet (Legislature), the Speaker of the House uses -kun when addressing Diet members and ministers. An exception was when Takako Doi was the Speaker of the lower house, where she used the title -san.

Chan 

 expresses that the speaker finds a person endearing. In general, -chan is used for young children, close friends, babies, grandparents and sometimes female adolescents. It may also be used towards cute animals, lovers, or youthful women. Chan is not usually used for strangers or people one has just met.

Although traditionally, honorifics are not applied to oneself, some people adopt the childlike affectation of referring to themselves in the third person using -chan (childlike because it suggests that one has not learned to distinguish between names used for oneself and names used by others). For example, a young girl named Kanako might call herself Kanako-chan rather than the first-person pronoun.

Tan
 is intended as an even more cute or affectionate variant of -chan. It evokes a small child's mispronunciation of that form of address, or baby talk – similar to how, for example, a speaker of English might use "widdle" instead of "little" when speaking to a baby. It is exclusively used by otaku. Moe anthropomorphisms are often labeled as -tan, e.g., the commercial mascot Habanero-tan, the manga figure Afghanis-tan or the OS-tans representing operating systems. A more notorious use of the honorific was for the murderer Nevada-tan.

Bō
 also expresses endearment. Like -chan, it can be used for young children but exclusively for boys instead of girls. See Diminutive suffix and Hypocorism for more info on this linguistic phenomenon.

Senpai and kōhai 

 is used to address or refer to one's older or more senior colleagues in a school, workplace, dojo, or sports club. Teachers are not senpai, but rather they are sensei. In a business environment, those with more experience are senpai.

Sensei and hakase 
 is used to refer to or address teachers, doctors, politicians, lawyers, and other authority figures. It is used to show respect to someone who has achieved mastery in an art form or some other skill, such as accomplished novelists, musicians, artists, and martial artists. In Japanese martial arts, sensei typically refers to someone who is the head of a dojo. As with senpai, sensei can be used not only as a suffix but also as a stand-alone title.

Shi 

 is used in formal writing and sometimes in very formal speech for referring to a person who is unfamiliar to the speaker, typically a person known through publications whom the speaker has never actually met. For example, the -shi title is common in the speech of newsreaders. It is preferred in legal documents, academic journals, and other formal written styles. Once a person's name has been used with -shi, the person can be referred to with shi alone, without the name, as long as only one person is being referred to.

O-  and go- prefix
O- (お-) and go- (ご-) are honorific prefixes used to exalt nouns. They can be applied to things like a garden (お庭, oniwa) or to people in conjunction with a suffix, like a doctor (お医者さん, oishasan). O- is used for words with Japanese roots, while go- is used for words with Chinese roots, although exceptions such as ojōsan (お嬢さん), oishasan above, okyakusama (お客様) where o- is used with Chinese words still occur. They are only ever used in the second or third person, and when applied to an object indicate respect for the owner of the object rather than the object itself. For example, one would refer to the parents of another as goryōshin (ご両親) while their own parents would be ryōshin (両親).

Other titles

Occupation-related titles 

It is common to use a job title after someone's name, instead of using a general honorific. For example, an  named Ichiro might be referred to as "Ichiro-senshu" rather than "Ichiro-san", and a  named Suzuki might be referred to as "Suzuki-tōryō" rather than "Suzuki-san".

Within one's own company or when speaking of another company, title + san is used, so a president is Shachō-san. When speaking of one's own company to a customer or another company, the title is used by itself or attached to a name, so a department chief named Suzuki is referred to as Buchō or Suzuki-buchō.

However, when referring to oneself, the title is used indirectly, as using it directly is perceived as arrogant. Thus, a department chief named Suzuki will introduce themselves as 部長の鈴木 buchō no Suzuki ("Suzuki, the department chief"), rather than ×鈴木部長 *Suzuki-buchō ("Department Chief Suzuki").

For criminals and the accused 
Convicted and suspected criminals were once referred to without any title. These titles can be used by themselves or attached to names.

However, although "suspect" and "defendant" began as neutral descriptions, they have become derogatory over time. But in addition to being criticized as an unnatural term, this title also became derogatory almost instantly—an example of euphemism treadmill.

For companies 
There are several different words for "our company" and "your company". Additionally, the neutral  can refer to either the speaker's or the listener's company. All of these titles are used by themselves, not attached to names.

These are often abbreviated as 株 and 有, respectively.

Imperial styles 
Heika (陛下 へいか), literally meaning "below the steps [of the throne]", and equivalent to "Majesty", is the most formal style of nobility in Japan, and is reserved only for the Emperor, Empress, Empress Dowager or Grand Empress Dowager. All other members of the Imperial Family are styled Denka (殿下 でんか), the equivalent of "Imperial Highness". Although the monarch of Japan is an emperor, he is not usually styled as "Imperial Majesty", however other members of the imperial family are customarily styled "His/Her Imperial Highness" whilst the Emperor's style in English is simply "His Majesty".

Dono / tono 
, pronounced  when attached to a name, roughly means "lord" or "master". It does not equate noble status. Rather it is a term akin to "milord" or French "monseigneur" or Portuguese/Spanish/Italian "don", and lies below -sama in level of respect. This title is not commonly used in daily conversation, but it is still used in some types of written business correspondence, as well as on certificates and awards, and in written correspondence in tea ceremonies. It is also used to indicate that the person referred to has the same (high) rank as the referrer, yet commands respect from the speaker.

No kimi 
 is another suffix coming from Japanese history. It was used to denominate lords and ladies in the court, especially during the Heian period. The most famous example is the Prince Hikaru Genji, protagonist of The Tale of Genji who was called . Nowadays, this suffix can be used as a metaphor for someone who behaves like a prince or princess from ancient times, but its use is very rare. Its main usage remains in historical dramas.

Ue 
 literally means "above", and denotes a high level of respect. Receipts that do not require specification of the payer's name are often filled in with ue-sama.

Martial arts titles 

Martial artists often address their teachers as sensei. Junior and senior students are organized via a senpai/kōhai system.
Also in some systems of karate, O-Sensei is the title of the (deceased) head of the style. This is how the founder of Aikido, Morihei Ueshiba is often referred to by practitioners of that art. The O- prefix itself, translating roughly as "great[er]" or "major", is also an honorific.

Various titles are also employed to refer to senior instructors. Which titles are used depends on the particular licensing organization.

Shōgō 
 are martial arts titles developed by the Dai Nippon Butoku Kai, the Kokusai Budoin, and the International Martial Arts Federation Europe. Many organizations in Japan award such titles upon a sincere study and dedication of Japanese martial arts. The below mentioned titles are awarded after observing a person's martial arts skills, his/her ability of teaching and understanding of martial arts and the most importantly as a role model and the perfection of one's character.

 : Polished Instructor (skilled person or expert teacher) Awarded to 4th dan and above.
  refers to an advanced teacher (senior teacher/expert). Awarded to 6th dan and above.
  refers to a senior expert considered a "teacher of teachers". This title is used by many different arts for the top few instructors of that style, and is sometimes translated "Grand Master". Awarded to 8th dan and above.
 : awarded by a special board of examiners.

Other martial arts titles 
 , master, especially a sumo coach. The literal sense is of someone in loco parentis. Also used by the Yakuza. In ancient times, it was also used by samurai to address the daimyō they serve, as he was Oyakata-sama, the clan's don.
 , merely means chief instructor; unlike the titles above, it is not related to grade.
 , intermediate instructor, also unrelated to grade.
 , another title used for martial arts instructors.
 , used for sumo wrestlers in the top two divisions (sekitori).

Levels of black belts are occasionally used as martial arts titles:
  – 1st dan
  – 2nd dan
  – 3rd dan
  – 4th dan
  – 5th dan
  – 6th dan
  – 7th dan
  – 8th dan
  – 9th dan
  – 10th dan

Religion 
 , Orthodox or Catholic priest (lit. Godfather). A  receives this title.
 , Protestant minister.

Euphonic suffixes and wordplay 
In informal speech, some Japanese people may use contrived suffixes in place of normal honorifics. This is essentially a form of wordplay, with suffixes being chosen for their sound, or for friendly or scornful connotations. Although the range of such suffixes that might be coined is limitless, some have gained such widespread usage that the boundary between established honorifics and wordplay has become a little blurred. Examples of such suffixes include variations on -chan (see below), -bee (scornful), and -rin (friendly).
Note that unlike a proper honorific, use of such suffixes is governed largely by how they sound in conjunction with a particular name, and on the effect the speaker is trying to achieve.

Baby talk variations 
Some honorifics have baby talk versions—mispronunciations stereotypically associated with small children and cuteness, and more frequently used in popular entertainment than in everyday speech.

There are even baby talk versions of baby talk versions.

Familial honorifics 
Words for family members have two different forms in Japanese. Honorific forms are used when addressing one's own family members or addressing or referring to someone else's family members. Using the suffix -san, as is most common, "mother" becomes  and "older brother" becomes . The honorifics -chan and -sama may also be used instead of -san, to express a higher level of closeness or reverence, respectively.

The general rule is that a younger family member (e.g., a young brother) addresses an older family member (e.g., a big sister) using an honorific form, while the more senior family member calls the younger one only by name.

The honorific forms are:
 : father.
 : uncle, or also "middle-aged gentleman".
 : grandfather, or also "male senior-citizen".
 : mother.
 : aunt, or also "middle-aged lady".
 : grandmother, or also "female senior-citizen".
 : big brother, or also "a young gentleman".
 : big sister, or also "a young lady".

The initial  prefix in these nouns is itself an honorific prefix. In more casual situations the speaker may omit this prefix but keep the suffix.
  or : when a young sibling addresses his or her own "big brother".
  or : when a young sibling addresses his or her own "big sister".
 : when a person addresses their own "wife" (the "mother" of their children).
 : when a person addresses their own "husband" (the "father" of their children).
 : when grandchildren address their "grandma".
 : when grandchildren address their "grandpa".

See also 
 Aizuchi
 Honorific speech in Japanese
 Etiquette in Japan
 Japanese pronouns
 Zen ranks and hierarchy

Other languages 
 T–V distinction (politeness differences more generally)
 Chinese honorifics
 Chinese titles
 Korean honorifics

References

Bibliography

Further reading 
  Reprinted in Natsuko Tsujimura (ed.) Japanese Linguistics: Critical Concepts in Linguistics. Oxford: Routledge, 2005, pp. 159–190.

External links 

 How to use Japanese suffixes
 Stason.org
 Japanese Dictionary with Hiragana, Katakana and Kanji virtual keyboards
 Japanese Honorifics - How to use San, Sama, Kun and Chan
How to use Otsukaresama